Vicidae is a family of bryozoans belonging to the order Cheilostomatida.

Genera:
 Cyclostomella Ortmann, 1890
 Vix Gordon, 1988

References

Cheilostomatida
Bryozoan families